Tetramoera schistaceana, the grey borer of sugar cane, is a moth of the family Tortricidae. It is found in Indonesia (Java), China (Guangdong), Taiwan, Malaysia, the Philippines, Mauritius, Hawaii, Madagascar and Réunion.

The wingspan is 14–18 mm.

The larvae feed on Saccharum dulce. The larvae make irregular short tunnels in the stem, usually near the surface and preferably in young hosts. Leaves of very young shoots may also be attacked, while in older canes the tops and older nodes may be damaged.

References

External links

Enarmoniini
Moths described in 1891
Moths of Madagascar
Moths of Japan
Moths of Mauritius
Moths of Réunion
Moths of Indonesia